Daniel Charles Piraro (born 1958) is a painter, illustrator, and cartoonist best known for his syndicated cartoon panel Bizarro. Piraro's cartoons have been reprinted in 16 book collections (as of 2012). He has also written three books of prose.

Biography
Piraro was born in Kansas City, Missouri, and his family moved to Ponca City, Oklahoma when he was 4 years old. When he was in junior high school his family moved to Tulsa, where he graduated from Booker T. Washington High School in 1976.

He dropped out of Washington University in St. Louis. He lived in Dallas and New York City for many years. He had two daughters with his first wife, and later married Ashley Lou Smith. After they divorced, he moved to Los Angeles, California. On October 30, 2016 he announced that he and his partner 'Olive Oyl' (or "O2") had purchased a house in Mexico and would be residing there beginning December 2016. Syndicated since 1985, Bizarro was appearing in 250 papers by 2006.

In 2013, Piraro coined the idiom "New Artists" to represent those cartoonists who distribute their work directly onto the Internet, without the use of a syndicate or a business intermediary.

In 2014, he hosted the Fox reality television show Utopia.

Political views
Piraro describes himself as "liberal and progressive politically" and identifies as an atheist. This being apparent in his work has garnered occasional complaints, as in 2005 when he offered newspapers a politics-free version of a comic supporting gay rights. A glitch however meant that papers printing in color received the political version while those in black and white received its tamer counterpart.
In 2002, Piraro became a vegan. His activism is visible in Bizarro, often incorporating vegan and animal cruelty themes into his cartoons. In an interview, he stated, "If you look at my strip over the years, I’ve always had a form of animal sympathy and animal rights." Piraro has also incorporated an entire section devoted to veganism on his website, detailing his reasons for becoming a vegan, and other vegan-related information.

In 2007, Piraro designed a limited edition T-shirt for endangeredwear.com to raise money for the Woodstock Farm Animal Sanctuary, a non-profit organization committed to ending the systematic abuse of animals used for food.

In a 2011 interview with This Land Press, Piraro discussed his challenges as a liberal growing up in Tulsa, OK.

Awards

Since 2001, Piraro has toured the U.S. with his one-man comedy show, The Bizarro Baloney Show, which won the 2002 New York International Fringe Festival's award for Best Solo Show. He played the full show for the final time in 2008, although he has performed bits from the show a few times since then.

Piraro received the National Cartoonists Society's Panel Cartoon Award for 1999, 2000 and 2001. Beginning in 2002, Piraro was nominated every year for the National Cartoonists Society’s Reuben Award, as Outstanding Cartoonist of the Year, and he finally was given a Reuben Award in 2010. Editorial cartoonist-illustrator Steve Greenberg commented:

Books

 Bizarro (1986) 
 Too Bizarro (1988) 
 Mondo Bizarro (1989) 
 Sumo Bizarro (1990) 
 Glasnost Bizarro (1990) 
 The Book of Lame Excuses (1991) 
 Post-Modern Bizarro (1991) 
 Best of Bizarro (1992) 
 Best of Bizarro II (1994) 
 Bizarro #9 (1995) 
 Bizarro #10 (1996) 
 Bizarro Among the Savages: A Relatively Famous Guy's Experiences on the Road and in the Homes of Strangers (1997) 
 Life Is Strange and So Are You: A Bizarro Sunday Treasury (2001) 
 The Three Little Pigs Buy the White House (2004) 
 Bizarro and Other Strange Manifestations of the Art of Dan Piraro (2006) 
 Bizarro Buccaneers: Nuttin' but Pirate Cartoons (2008) 
 Bizarro Heroes (2011) 
 Creative Haven Bizarro Land Coloring Book (2016)

Audiobook narrator
 Author – Daniel J. Levitin (2016).

References

External links

 
 National Cartoonists Society (NCS)
 
 
 
 
 
 

1958 births
American comic strip cartoonists
20th-century American painters
American male painters
21st-century American painters
21st-century male artists
Booker T. Washington High School (Tulsa, Oklahoma) alumni
Living people
People from Dallas
Artists from Tulsa, Oklahoma
Washington University in St. Louis alumni
Reuben Award winners
Artists from Kansas City, Missouri